Arthur Reginald Curren (27 June 1914 – 25 September 1996) was an Australian politician who represented the South Australian House of Assembly seat of Chaffey for the Labor Party from 1962 to 1968 and 1970 to 1973.

References

 

1914 births
1996 deaths
Members of the South Australian House of Assembly
20th-century Australian politicians
Australian Labor Party members of the Parliament of South Australia